Mr. or Mister India may refer to:

Pageants
 Mister India World, a national beauty pageant in India that sends its winners to Mister World and Mister Supranational
 Rubaru Mister India, a national Indian beauty pageant in India that sends its winners to Mister Global and Mister Model International
 Gladrags Manhunt and Megamodel Contest, a national beauty pageant in India that sends its winner to Manhunt International
 Grasim Mr. India, a former national beauty pageant in India that sent its winners to Mister World and Mister International
 Mr. Gay India, a national beauty pageant in India that sends its winner to Mr Gay World

Other uses
 Mr. India (1961 film), an Indian film directed by G. P. Sippy
 Mr. India (1987 film), an Indian science fiction film directed by Shekhar Kapur
 Mr India – The Ride, a motion-simulator ride at the Adlabs Imagica amusement park in Mumbai, India